The Hong Kong national korfball team is managed by the Hong Kong China Korfball Association (HKCKA), representing Hong Kong in Korfball international competitions.

The Hong Kong China Korfball Association (HKCKA) was established in 1999 with its mission of promotion and raising the standard of Korfball in Hong Kong. 

Throughout the years, continuing efforts in the promotion and development of korfball for the local community were made with the focus to prepare players and officials to participate and achieve in both local and international korfball competitions.

Tournament history

Current squad
National team in the 2015 IKF World Korfball Championship

Coach:  Cheng Wai Ming

References

External links
 Hong Kong China Korfball Association Official Website
 Hong Kong China Korfball Association Facebook Page

National korfball teams
Korfball
National team